Eric Justin Toth (alias/a.k.a. David Bussone) (born February 13, 1982) is an American former fugitive and sex offender convicted of possessing and producing child pornography. On April 10, 2012, Toth replaced Osama bin Laden on the FBI Ten Most Wanted list as the 495th fugitive to be placed on that list by the FBI. One alleged reason he was chosen for the list is that his distinctive appearance—he is tall and thin, with a mole under his left eye—would make it hard for him to hide if his case became well publicized. Toth was captured in Esteli, Nicaragua on April 10, 2013 and extradited on April 22, 2013, to the United States to face trial.

Biography
Eric Toth was born in Hammond, Indiana, and was raised in Highland, Indiana. Toth attended Cornell University for a year and transferred to Purdue University, where he graduated with a bachelor's degree in education. 
In 2008, he was accused of producing pornographic photographs and video footage of young boys while working as a third-grade teacher in Washington, D.C.

Toth has often been described as a computer expert; he has demonstrated above-average knowledge regarding computers, the use of the Internet, and security awareness. Toth has the ability to integrate into various socio-economic classes and is an expert at social engineering. He used social networking sites regularly. His educational background was conducive to gaining employment in fields having a connection to children. Some have described Toth as a compulsive liar.

Toth was captured by the Nicaraguan police in April 2013 in Estelí, a northern city of Nicaragua. He was immediately extradited to the United States to face trial.

Sentence
In March 2014, Toth was sentenced in federal court to 25 years in prison. He is currently incarcerated at FCI Fort Dix.

References

External links
 Toth's FBI Top 10 Most Wanted Fugitive Alert
 Additional information from America's Most Wanted
 cnn.com

1982 births
21st-century American criminals
American people convicted of child pornography offenses
American people of Slovak descent
Cornell University alumni
Elder High School alumni
Fugitives
Living people
Prisoners and detainees of the United States federal government
Purdue University College of Education alumni
Schoolteachers from Washington, D.C.
Violence against men in North America